2017 Portugal wildfires may refer to:

 June 2017 Portugal wildfires
 October 2017 Iberian wildfires